William Richardson (born 25 October 1943) is an English former professional footballer who played as a winger in the Football League for Mansfield Town and York City, in non-League football for South Shields and was on the books of Sunderland without making a league appearance.

References

1943 births
Living people
People from Bedlington
Footballers from Northumberland
English footballers
Association football defenders
Sunderland A.F.C. players
Mansfield Town F.C. players
York City F.C. players
South Shields F.C. (1936) players
English Football League players